is the 15th studio album by Japanese entertainer Miho Nakayama. Released through King Records on June 23, 1993, it is Nakayama's fifth studio release (after One and Only, Mind Game, Merry Merry, and Dé eaya) to not feature a single. It was also Nakayama's second album (after Mellow) to be self-produced and recorded in Los Angeles.

The album peaked at No. 4 on Oricon's albums chart. It also sold over 145,000 copies and was certified Gold by the RIAJ.

Track listing

Personnel
 Miho Nakayama – vocals
 Rob Pfeifer – programming (1, 7)
 Ken Shiguma – programming (11)
 Atsushi Umehara – programming (11)
 Jeff Pfeifer – keyboards (1, 7)
 Ian Prince – keyboards, programming (2, 6)
 Tom Keane – keyboards, programming (4, 9)
 Bill Meyers – keyboards, programming (5, 8)
 Reggie Turner – keyboards, programming (10)
 Hidetoshi Yamada – keyboards (11)
 Randy Waldman – piano, bass (3)
 Michael Landau – guitar (1–2, 5–9)
 Bruce Gaitsch – guitar (3)
 David Williams – guitar (4)
 John Peña – bass (6)
 Mike Porcaro – bass (9)
 Carlos Vega – drums (9)
 Andre Williams – drums (10)
 Keith Williams – drums (10)
 Chris Trujillo – percussion (1, 5, 7–8)
 Paulinho da Costa – percussion (3)
 Jerry Hey – trumpet (1, 4, 8)
 Gary Grant – trumpet (1, 4, 8)
 Bill Reichenbach Jr. – trombone (1, 4, 8)
 Dan Higgins – saxophone (1, 4), flute (7)
 Brandon Fields – saxophone (3)
 Dave Koz – saxophone (6, 9)
 Kim Hutcheroft – saxophone (8)
 Jake H. Concepcion – saxophone (11)
 Tetsuya Ochiai – strings (11)
 Hiroki Kashiwagi – strings (11)
 Jackie – backing vocals (1)
 Misa Nakayama – backing vocals (1)
 Joey Johnson – backing vocals (2)
 Warnel Johns – backing vocals (2)
 Yuiko Tsubokura – backing vocals (4, 8)
 Keiko Wada – backing vocals (4, 8)
 Junko Hirotani – backing vocals (5–6, 11)
 Kiyoshi Hiyama – backing vocals (5–6)
 Yasuhiro Kido – backing vocals (6)
 Cindy – backing vocals (10)
 Jacque Mastin – backing vocals (10)
 Don Jeffries – backing vocals (10)

Charts

Certification

References

External links
 
 
 

1993 albums
Miho Nakayama albums
Japanese-language albums
King Records (Japan) albums